Central Lafourche High School (CLHS) is a public high school serving students in grades 9 through 12 in Mathews, unincorporated Lafourche Parish, Louisiana, United States, about  southwest of New Orleans. The school, which has a Raceland postal address, is one of three high schools in the Lafourche Parish Public Schools district.

It serves the communities of: Mathews, Raceland, Lockport, Lockport Heights,. and Gheens as well as the Lafourche Parish section of Des Allemands.

History
The school is a consolidation of the former Raceland High School and Lockport High School. It was established by the Lafourche Parish School Board in 1965 as a three-year, co-educational senior high school. It was built at a cost of almost $4,000,000. The school became a reality with the 1966-1967 school session. Until the building was completed, the school was housed in temporary facilities on the campus of the former Lockport High School. The ninth grade and Pre G.E.D./Skills Option Programs were added to the Central Lafourche Curriculum in the 2001-2002 school year.

In 1968 the high school for black students, C.M. Washington High School, was dissolved due to racial integration. Therefore black students now attended the previously all-white school.

Between 2015 and 2016, according to the Louisiana State Department of Education rankings, this school's rank increased from a "B" to an "A".

Athletics
Central Lafourche High athletics competes in the LHSAA.

The school competes interscholastically in several sports, including:

The Trojan Lancer Marching Band
Dance Team (Trojanettes)
Football
Baseball
Basketball
Bowling
Varsity cheer
Junior varsity cheer
Cross country
Fishing
Golf
Soccer
Softball
Swimming
Tennis
Track and field
Volleyball

Notable alumni
 Tommy Hodson - LSU and NFL quarterback; four-time All SEC Team
 Andrew Simoncelli - Nicholls State University associate professor; WWL-TV producer
 Larry Wilson - Nicholls State basketball player and NBA draft pick

References

External links
School website
School district website

Public high schools in Louisiana
Schools in Lafourche Parish, Louisiana
1965 establishments in Louisiana
Educational institutions established in 1965